Jonathan Dokuchitz is an American actor and singer who works mainly on Broadway. He has starred in The Who's Tommy as Captain Walker, and also was the singing voice for John Cusack's Dimitri in Anastasia (1997 film).

Featured productions 
He has voiced characters in several animated films including Anastasia (1997), The Hunchback of Notre Dame (1996), and Pocahontas (1995).
He has been part of many productions on Broadway, including The Who's Tommy, which earned five Tony Awards.
He has also starred in several television programmes. He played Danny in the episode 'The Agony and the Ex-tacy' of 'Sex and the City'. He also played Barry Janis in the episode 'The Ultimatum' in The $treet.

In 2017, he had moved out of New York and was living in Gilbertsville, New York.

Musical theatre

Filmography

Film

Television

References 

American male musical theatre actors
Living people
Year of birth missing (living people)